Concordia Lutheran High School is a secondary school affiliated with the Lutheran Church–Missouri Synod (LCMS), serving grades 9 - 12 in the Fort Wayne, Indiana area of the United States.

History
In 1916, the LCMS congregations in Fort Wayne started the Luther Institute, a two-year secondary school teaching basic office skills such as typing and shorthand, and also business law and Bible classes. Initially the school used facilities in those congregations. In 1920, the leaders of the Luther Institute suggested a merger with the high school department of Concordia College, but no agreement was reached, so in 1924-25 the institute erected a three-story building (demolished in 2006) at the corner of Barr and Washington.

Negotiations for the merger were successfully reopened in 1934. The resulting Lutheran High School opened in 1935, using two floors of Hanser Hall on the college campus after seven Lutheran churches in Fort Wayne raised $6,000 to renovate and equip the facility. From 1935 to 1947, the college controlled the academic aspects of the high school, while the Lutheran High School Association handled the financial aspects. The high school undertook steps to receive accreditation from the state of Indiana in 1938.

The new building at Anthony Boulevard and Maumee Avenue opened in 1952. The high school continued to use the athletic and other facilities of the college. In 1955, the name of the school was officially changed to Concordia Lutheran High School.

In 1957, the LCMS decided to close Concordia College. The next year the remainder of the college campus was sold to Indiana Technical College.

That same year, 1958, a group of Lutheran businessmen took an option on  containing Zollner Stadium at North Anthony Boulevard and St. Joe River Drive. The next year the high school association purchased that property and an additional  on the west side of Anthony for construction of the current building. After $950,000 was raised in a pledge drive, ground was broken for the new facility, designed by architect James Sherbondy, in March 1963. Classes moved to the new campus in the fall of 1964. The old campus was sold to Indiana Technical College, which uses the former high school building as its Cunningham Business Center.

In 1973, a music wing, a chapel-auditorium, and additional classrooms were constructed. Zollner Stadium has also been rebuilt.

Athletics
The Concordia Lutheran Cadets compete in the Summit Athletic Conference. The school colors are maroon and white. Concordia offers the following Indiana High School Athletic Association (IHSAA) sanctioned sports:

Baseball (boys) 
Basketball (girls and boys) 
Girls state champion - 2010, 2012
Cross country (girls and boys) 
Girls state champion - 1983
Boys state champion - 2019
Football (boys) 
State champion - 2016
Golf (girls and boys) 
Gymnastics (girls)
Soccer (girls and boys) 
Softball (girls) 
Swim and dive (girls and boys) 
Tennis (girls and boys) 
Track and field (girls and boys) 
Boys state champion - 1999
Volleyball (girls)
State champion - 2014
Wrestling (boys)

Arts
The Concordia Lutheran High School Marching Cadets received first place at the Indiana State School Music Association (ISSMA) Class C State Finals in 2013. Concordia Lutheran High School is home to five total choirs: Women's Chorus (for freshmen women), Men's Chorus (for freshmen men), Bella Voce (for freshmen and sophomore women), A Capella (for sophomore through senior men and women), and the Maroon Standard also known as the Chamber Choir (students auditioned out of the bigger A Capella Choir).

Notable alumni
Glenn Berggoetz - director, writer, and actor
Dave Herman - professional MMA fighter
 Eugene E. Parker - NFL agent
 Brian Reith - Major League Baseball (MLB) player

See also
 List of high schools in Indiana

References

External links

Private high schools in Indiana
Educational institutions established in 1935
Schools in Fort Wayne, Indiana
1935 establishments in Indiana
Secondary schools affiliated with the Lutheran Church–Missouri Synod
Lutheran schools in Indiana